Francisco Javier Yubero Solanilla (21 January 1972 – 22 September 2005) was a Spanish footballer who played as a goalkeeper.

Football career
Born in Irun, Gipuzkoa, Yubero made his professional debut with Real Sociedad in 1991–92, playing in one game. In the following season, he won the battle for first-choice with another youth graduate of the club, Alberto, and was the undisputed starter as the Basques finished 13th in La Liga.

Subsequently, Yubero's career went downhill, with unassuming spells at Real Betis and CP Mérida in the second division. He settled in the same level with SD Eibar, and did appear in 39 matches in his third year but, after a move to Rayo Vallecano, again featured very rarely.

Yubero would play until early 2003, in divisions three and four. As he was with amateur side Torredonjimeno CF, he was diagnosed with pancreatic cancer, which forced him to quit the game at 31; two years later, he succumbed to the disease.

References

External links

1972 births
2005 deaths
Sportspeople from Irun
Spanish footballers
Footballers from the Basque Country (autonomous community)
Association football goalkeepers
La Liga players
Segunda División players
Segunda División B players
Real Sociedad B footballers
Real Sociedad footballers
Real Betis players
CP Mérida footballers
SD Eibar footballers
Rayo Vallecano players
Zamora CF footballers
Deaths from pancreatic cancer
Deaths from cancer in Spain